The Bab Ballads is a collection of light verses by W. S. Gilbert (1836–1911), illustrated with his own comic drawings.  The book takes its title from Gilbert's childhood nickname. He later began to sign his illustrations "Bab". Gilbert wrote the "ballads" collected in the book before he became famous for his comic opera librettos with Arthur Sullivan.  In writing these verses Gilbert developed his "topsy-turvy" style in which the humour is derived by setting up a ridiculous premise and working out its logical consequences, however absurd.  The ballads also reveal Gilbert's cynical and satirical approach to humour.

They became famous on their own, as well as being a source for plot elements, characters and songs that Gilbert recycled in the Gilbert and Sullivan operas.  They were read aloud at private dinner-parties, at public banquets and even in the House of Lords. The ballads have been much published, and some have been recorded or otherwise adapted.

Early history

Gilbert himself explained how The Bab Ballads came about:

In 1861 the magazine Fun was started under the editorship of Mr. H. J. Byron. With much labour I turned out an article three-quarters of a column long, and sent it to the editor, together with a half-page drawing on wood. A day or two later the printer of the paper called upon me, with Mr Byron's compliments, and staggered me with a request to contribute a column of "copy" and a half-page drawing every week for the term of my natural life. I hardly knew how to treat the offer, for it seemed to me that into that short article I had poured all I knew. I was empty. I had exhausted myself: I didn't know any more. However, the printer encouraged me (with Mr. Byron's compliments), and I said I would try. I did try, and I found to my surprise that there was a little left, and enough indeed to enable me to contribute some hundreds of columns to the periodical throughout his editorship, and that of his successor, poor Tom Hood! (Gilbert 1883).

For ten years Gilbert wrote articles and poems for Fun, of which he was also the drama critic. Gilbert's first column "cannot now be identified" (Stedman 1996, p. 11). The first known contribution is a drawing titled "Some mistake here" on page 56 of the issue for 26 October 1861 (Plumb 2004, p. 499). Some of Gilbert's early work for the journal remains unidentified because many pieces were unsigned.  The earliest pieces that Gilbert himself considered worthy to be collected in The Bab Ballads started to appear in 1865, and then much more steadily from 1866 to 1869.

The series takes its title from the nickname "Bab", which is short for "baby". It may also be a homage to Charles Dickens's pen name "Boz".  Gilbert did not start signing his drawings "Bab" regularly until 1866, and he did not start calling the poems The Bab Ballads until the first collected edition was published in 1869. From then on his new poems in Fun were captioned "The Bab Ballads".

Gilbert also started numbering the poems, with "Mister William" (published 6 February 1869) as No. 60. However, it is not certain which poems Gilbert considered to be Nos. 1–59. Ellis counts backwards, including only those poems with drawings, and finds that the first "Bab Ballad" was "The Story of Gentle Archibald" (Ellis 1970, p. 13). However, Gilbert did not include "Gentle Archibald" in his collected editions, while he did include several poems published earlier than that. Nor did Gilbert limit the collected editions to poems with illustrations.

By 1870 Gilbert's output of "Bab Ballads" had started to tail off considerably, corresponding to his rising success as a dramatist. The last poem that Gilbert himself considered to be a "Bab Ballad", "Old Paul and Old Tim," appeared in Fun in January 1871. In the remaining forty years of his life Gilbert made only a handful of verse contributions to periodicals. Some posthumous editions of The Bab Ballads have included these later poems, although Gilbert did not.

Subsequent publication

By 1868 Gilbert's poems had won sufficient popularity to justify a collected edition. He selected forty-four of the poems (thirty-four of them illustrated) for an edition of The "Bab" Ballads – Much Sound and Little Sense. A second collected edition, More "Bab" Ballads, including thirty-five ballads (all illustrated), appeared in 1872. In 1876 Gilbert collected fifty of his favourite poems in Fifty "Bab" Ballads, with one poem being collected for the first time ("Etiquette") and twenty-five poems that had appeared in the earlier volumes being left out. As Gilbert explained:

The period during which they were written extended over some three or four years; many, however, were composed hastily, and under the discomforting necessity of having to turn out a quantity of lively verse by a certain day in every week. As it seemed to me (and to others) that the volumes were disfigured by the presence of these hastily written impostors, I thought it better to withdraw from both volumes such Ballads as seemed to show evidence of carelessness or undue haste, and to publish the remainder in the compact form under which they are now presented to the reader. (Gilbert 1876, p. vii).

Gilbert's readers were not happy with the loss, and in 1882 Gilbert published all of the poems that had appeared in either The "Bab" Ballads or More "Bab" Ballads, once again excluding "Etiquette." Some twentieth-century editions of More "Bab" Ballads include "Etiquette". In 1890 Gilbert produced Songs of a Savoyard, a volume of sixty-nine detached lyrics from the Savoy Operas, each with a new title, and some of them slightly reworded to fit the changed context. Many of them also received "Bab" illustrations in the familiar style. He also included two deleted lyrics from Iolanthe (footnoted as "omitted in representation"). The effect was that of a new volume of "Bab Ballads". Indeed, Gilbert considered calling the volume The Savoy Ballads (Ellis 1970, p. 27, n. 53).

Finally, in 1898 Gilbert produced The Bab Ballads, with which are included Songs of a Savoyard. This volume included all of the "Bab Ballads" that had appeared in any of the earlier collected volumes, the sixty-nine "Songs of a Savoyard" published in 1890, and eighteen additional lyrics in the same format from the four operas he had written since then. The Bab Ballads and the illustrated opera lyrics were alternated, creating the impression of one integrated body of work. Gilbert also added more than two hundred new drawings, providing illustrations for the ten ballads that had previously lacked them, and replacing most of the others. He wrote:

I have always felt that many of the original illustrations to The Bab Ballads erred gravely in the direction of unnecessary extravagance. This defect I have endeavoured to correct through the medium of the two hundred new drawings which I have designed for this volume. I am afraid I cannot claim for them any other recommendation. (Gilbert 1897).

It was in this form that The Bab Ballads remained almost constantly in print until the expiration of the copyright at the end of 1961. James Ellis's new edition in 1970 restored the original drawings, retaining from the edition of 1898 only those drawings that went with the previously unillustrated ballads.

Identification and Attribution
There is no universally agreed list of poems that constitute The Bab Ballads. The series clearly includes all the poems that Gilbert himself published under that title, but there are others he did not include in any of the collected editions published in his lifetime. Most writers have accepted as "Bab Ballads" any poems, whether illustrated or not, that Gilbert contributed to periodicals, not counting poems written or repurposed as operatic lyrics.

After Gilbert's death there were several attempts to identify additional ballads that were missing from the collected editions that had been published to that point. Dark & Gray (1923), Goldberg (1929), and Searle (1932) identified and published additional ballads, not all of which have been accepted into the canon. The most recent edition, edited by James Ellis (1970), includes all the poems that Gilbert himself acknowledged, all the poems from Dark & Gray, Goldberg, and/or Searle that Ellis finds authentic, and others identified by no other previous compilers.

There are several ballads that Ellis identifies as Gilbert's either on stylistic grounds or by the presence of a "Bab" illustration accompanying the poem in the original publication. These include two distinct poems called "The Cattle Show", as well as "Sixty-Three and Sixty-Four", "The Dream", "The Baron Klopfzetterheim" and "Down to the Derby". These attributions are provisional and have not been accepted by all scholars because the poems themselves are unsigned and Gilbert sometimes provided illustrations for the work of other writers.

Starting with the "new series" of Fun (those with 'n.s.' in the source reference), Gilbert's authorship is not in doubt, as the pieces for which he was paid can be confirmed from the proprietors' copies of that journal, which now reside in the Huntington Library.

List of "Bab Ballads"
The table below lists all the "Bab Ballads" that are included in James Ellis's edition of 1970. The second column shows the reference for the periodical in which each poem originally appeared and the third column shows the collection(s) that have included the poem. The following abbreviations are used:

 TBB: The "Bab" Ballads (London: John Camden Hotten, 1868).
 MBB: More "Bab" Ballads (London: Routledge, 1872)
 50BB: Fifty "Bab" Ballads ((London: Routledge, 1876)
 D&G: W.S. Gilbert: His Life and Letters, Sidney Dark & Rowland Grey (Methuen, 1923).
 Goldberg: Story of Gilbert and Sullivan, Isaac Goldberg (John Murray, 1929).
 Searle: Lost Bab Ballads, Townley Searle (G. P. Putnam's Sons, Ltd. 1932),.
 Ellis: The Bab Ballads, James Ellis, ed. (Belknap Press, 1970).

Starting with "Mister William" Gilbert assigned numbers to most of the ballads that appeared in Fun. Those numbers are shown in the second column after the source reference.

Adaptations
Some of the "Bab Ballads" have been recorded by several performers, including Stanley Holloway (1959) Redvers Kyle (1963)<ref>Shepherd, Marc. [http://gasdisc.oakapplepress.com/mdkylebabs.htm "The Bab Ballads by W. S. Gilbert"], Gilbert & Sullivan Discography, 27 August 2002, accessed 25 August 2016</ref> and Jim Broadbent (1999). In 2016, The W. S. Gilbert Society released a 2-CD set read by various British performers, including several who performed with the D'Oyly Carte Opera Company.

Four have been set to music by Ken Malucelli, and two have been adapted for the stage by Brian Mitchell and Joseph Nixon.

See also
 Pineapple Poll, ballet based on "The Bumboat Woman's Story"

References

 Complete edition in one volume incorporating the original "Bab" Ballads and More "Bab" Ballads''.

Notes

External links

Introduction to the Bab Ballads

1868 poetry books
English poetry collections
British anthologies
Works by W. S. Gilbert